WDR VERA is a German, public radio station owned and operated by the Westdeutscher Rundfunk (WDR).

WDR VERA is the traffic channel of the WDR, started on 30 January 1997 as part of the North Rhine-Westphalian DAB pilot project, is broadcast via DAB+ and a telephone announcement service (+49/221/1680 3050).

VERA stands for VErkehr (traffic) in Real Audio or Verkehrsradio.

The 24-hour program consists entirely of traffic information updated and compiled by the WDR Traffic Department. All traffic information and messages are provided through a speech synthesis system, which is then read out by a computer-generated male voice. There is no live announcer on the air.

References

Westdeutscher Rundfunk
Radio stations in Germany
Radio stations established in 1997
1997 establishments in Germany
Mass media in Cologne